Muttonwood is a common name for several plants and may refer to:

Myrsine species, including:
Myrsine variabilis, variable muttonwood, native to Australia
Myrsine howittiana, brush muttonwood, native to Australia
Turpinia occidentalis, native to Central America